Anna of Glogau (1250/52 – 25 June 1271) was the eldest child of Konrad I, Duke of Silesia-Glogau and his first wife Salome of Greater Poland. Anna was a member of the House of Piast.

Family 
Anna's paternal grandparents were, Henry II the Pious and his wife, Anna of Bohemia. Anna's maternal grandfather was, Władysław Odonic, King of Poland. Anna's siblings included: Henry III, Duke of Silesia-Glogau; successor to their father, Euphemia of Glogau; she was married to Albert I of Gorizia, Konrad II the Hunchback and Przemko of Ścinawa; he was killed in battle.

Marriage 
In 1260, Anna married Louis II, Duke of Bavaria. This was Louis' second marriage after his violent first marriage to Marie of Brabant, Louis had Marie executed because he believed she was having an affair. Louis' first marriage was childless.

Louis and Anna had two children, they were:
 Maria (born 1261, date of death unknown), a nun in Marienburg abbey
 Ludwig (13 September 1267 – 23 November 1290), killed at a tournament at Nuremberg.

Anna's son, Ludwig would have probably become Duke of Bavaria, but died at a tournament and he died before his father. Anna herself died in 1271. Her husband married one more time, to Matilda of Habsburg. Matilda bore Louis two surviving sons, their younger son was Louis IV, Holy Roman Emperor.

Sources 
 Anna von Schlesien-Glogau 

1250 births
1271 deaths
Piast dynasty
13th-century Polish people
13th-century Polish women